Schefflera bourdillonii is a species of plant in the family  Araliaceae. It is endemic to Kerala in India.

References

bourdillonii
Flora of Kerala
Endangered plants
Taxonomy articles created by Polbot